Nyquist criterion may refer to:
Nyquist stability criterion, a graphical technique for determining the stability of a feedback control system
Nyquist frequency, ½ of the sampling rate of a discrete signal processing system
Nyquist rate, a rate used in signal processing
Nyquist ISI criterion, a condition to avoid intersymbol interference